Altnabreac railway station is a rural railway station in the Highland council area of Scotland. It serves the area of Altnabreac  a settlement in which the station itself is the main component  in the historic county of Caithness. The name Altnabreac derives from the Scots Gaelic Allt nam Breac, meaning "the stream of the trout".

It has a single platform long enough to accommodate a four-carriage train. The station is managed by ScotRail, who operate all trains serving it.

History

The station was opened by the Sutherland and Caithness Railway on 28 July 1874 and later absorbed by the Highland Railway.

The reason for the station's construction is a mystery. However, it had a passing loop with a water tank so may have been established for purely operational reasons. The water tank has not seen regular use since 1962 and the line was singled in 1986; both the water tank and the old second platform can still be seen.

Taken into the London, Midland and Scottish Railway during the Grouping of 1923, the line then passed on to the Scottish Region of British Railways on nationalisation in 1948. When Sectorisation was introduced by British Rail, the station became part of ScotRail until the Privatisation of British Rail.

Accidents and incidents 
In January 1978, a train from Inverness to Wick became trapped in a blizzard, with approximately 70 passengers on board. A rescue locomotive was sent to recover the train but also had to turn back. All 70 passengers - apart from some who walked the 5 miles to Scotscalder - were eventually taken there by rescue helicopters approximately 24 hours after leaving Inverness.

Location 
The station is on a private dirt road between Loch More and Forsinain, marked as a cycle trail on Ordnance Survey maps. Dixe Wills says of the area:"What is all the more remarkable is that the following events took place took place in the vicinity of the most remote station on my itinerary, a place girded round by peat-black lochs and dismal bogs and overshadowed by dark, anonymous plantations of doomed conifers, where nothing of any note has happened these past 70 years save for intense despondent brooding."The nearest village is Westerdale, which itself is in fact closer to Scotscalder station. Nevertheless, despite its isolation, the station is used by walkers and off-road cyclists, as well as railway enthusiasts and those who enjoy visiting remote locations.

Facilities 
The station has a help point, bike racks and a small waiting shelter. As there are no facilities to purchase tickets, passengers must buy one in advance, or from the guard on the train.

Passenger volume 
In the 201819 financial year the station saw 408 passengers, making it the 28th least-used station in the United Kingdom, although four other stations on the Far North Line had even fewer passengers, including neighbouring Scotscalder.

The statistics cover twelve month periods that start in April.

Services 

(There is a fourth train bound for Inverness but it is not scheduled to call at Altnabreac.) On Sundays there is just one train per day each way.

This station is designated as a request stop. This means that passengers intending to alight must inform the guard in advance, and any passengers wishing to board must ensure they are in view of the train driver, and are required to use a hand signal to stop the train.

References

Bibliography

External links

 RAILSCOT article on Sutherland and Caithness Railway
 RAILSCOT page on Altnabreac

Railway stations in Caithness
Railway stations in Great Britain opened in 1874
Railway stations served by ScotRail
Railway request stops in Great Britain
Former Highland Railway stations
Low usage railway stations in the United Kingdom
Railway stations in Great Britain without road access